Mikel de Sa Gomes (born 6 July 1990) is an Andorran sprinter. He competed in the 100 metres event at the 2013 World Championships in Athletics. He currently holds the Andorran record on the 100 meters outdoor U23, setting 11"20 in Barcelona in 2012.

References

1990 births
Living people
Andorran male sprinters
Place of birth missing (living people)
World Athletics Championships athletes for Andorra
Athletes (track and field) at the 2015 European Games
European Games competitors for Andorra